In mathematics, the Milstein method is a technique for the approximate numerical solution of a stochastic differential equation. It is named after Grigori N. Milstein who first published it in 1974.

Description
Consider the autonomous Itō stochastic differential equation:

with initial condition , where  stands for the Wiener process, and suppose that we wish to solve this SDE on some interval of time . Then the Milstein approximation to the true solution  is the Markov chain  defined as follows:

 partition the interval  into  equal subintervals of width : 
 set 

The Milstein scheme has both weak and strong order of convergence, which is superior to the Euler–Maruyama method, which in turn has the same weak order of convergence, but inferior strong order of convergence, .

Intuitive derivation 

For this derivation, we will only look at geometric Brownian motion (GBM), the stochastic differential equation of which is given by:

Using Itō's lemma we get:

Thus, the solution to the GBM SDE is:

where

See numerical solution is presented above for three different trajectories.

Computer implementation 
The following Python code implements the Milstein method and uses it to solve the SDE describing the Geometric Brownian Motion defined by

# -*- coding: utf-8 -*-
# Milstein Method

import numpy as np
import matplotlib.pyplot as plt

num_sims = 1  # One Example

# One Second and thousand grid points
t_init, t_end = 0, 1
N = 1000 # Compute 1000 grid points
dt = float(t_end - t_init) / N

## Initial Conditions
y_init = 1
μ, σ = 3, 1

# dw Random process
def dW(Δt):
    """Random sample normal distribution"""
    return np.random.normal(loc=0.0, scale=np.sqrt(Δt))

# vectors to fill
ts = np.arange(t_init, t_end + dt, dt)
ys = np.zeros(N + 1)
ys[0] = y_init

# Loop
for _ in range(num_sims):
    for i in range(1, ts.size):
        t = (i - 1) * dt
        y = ys[i - 1]
        # Milstein method
        dw_ = dW(dt)
        ys[i] = y + μ * dt * y + σ * y * dw_ + 0.5 * σ**2 * y * (dw_**2 - dt)
    plt.plot(ts, ys)

# Plot
plt.xlabel("time (s)")
plt.grid()
h = plt.ylabel("y")
h.set_rotation(0)
plt.show()

See also 
 Euler–Maruyama method

References

Further reading
 

Numerical differential equations
Stochastic differential equations